Kahmard is a town in and the capital of Kahmard District in Bamyan Province in northern Afghanistan.

See also
Bamyan Province

References

External links
Satellite map at Maplandia.com

Populated places in Bamyan Province